NW Puppis, also known as υ2 Puppis, is a star in the constellation Puppis. Anamarija Stankov ruled this star out as a Beta Cephei variable.

Neither component of this double is given a letter in Lacaille's catalogue or the British Association star catalogue. Gould gave them the designations (Latin letter) v1 and v2 Puppis, but these are rarely used. Lacaille applied the Greek letter υ to the star now called υ Carinae. The designation υ2 first appeared in several catalogues at the end of the 19th century.

References

Puppis
B-type main-sequence stars
Puppis, NW
2790
057219
035406
Durchmusterung objects
Beta Cephei variables
Emission-line stars
Puppis, Upsilon2